Mélanie Watt (born August 20, 1975 in Montreal, Quebec) is a Canadian children's author and illustrator. She is best known for Scaredy Squirrel, which won the Ruth & Sylvia Schwartz Children's Book Award and was published in French as Frisson l'écureuil. Melanie Watt's other major picture book series is Chester, which is about a cat named Chester who competes with Watt for the chance to write and illustrate his books. The Chester book received a starred review from Publishers Weekly.

As of 2012, she has sold over two million books that have been translated into 23 languages.

Biography 
As a child, Mélanie Watt enjoyed drawing the comic strip character Garfield. The Scaredy Squirrel series is influenced by Watt's childhood experiences, including her childhood fear of sharks. She received a BA in graphic design from the Université du Québec à Montréal. In 1999, while enrolled in an illustration class taught by Michele Lemieux, Watt wrote her first story, Leon the Chameleon.

One of her inspirations is children's book author Mo Willems.

She currently resides near Montreal.

Works

Scaredy Squirrel 
 Scaredy Squirrel (2006)
 Scaredy Squirrel Makes a Friend (2007)
 Scaredy Squirrel at the Beach (2008)
 Scaredy Squirrel at Night (2009)
 Scaredy Squirrel Has a Birthday Party (2011)
 Scaredy Squirrel Goes Camping (2013)
 Scaredy Squirrel Prepares For Halloween (2013)

Chester 
 Chester (2009)
 Chester's Back! (2013)
 Chester's Masterpiece (2020)

Other works 
 Leon the Chameleon (2001)
 Colors (2005)
 Augustine (2009)
 You're Finally Here! (2011)
 Have I Got a Book for You (2013)
 Bug in a Vacuum (2015)

References

External links 

 

1975 births
Canadian women children's writers
Canadian children's writers in French
Living people
Writers from Montreal
Université du Québec à Montréal alumni